The Marsk (English: Marshal), from 1536 the Rigsmarsk, was in Denmark the head of the armed forces from the beginning of the 13th century until the introduction of the absolute monarchy in the 1660s. It was the third highest office in the country after the Steward of the Realm and the Chancellor. The Rigsmarsk was appointed by the king from among Danish-born nobles. During some periods, the king chose to leave the office vacant and instead personally lead the military. This was the case from 1380/81 and until 1440.

In the beginning the Marsk was one of the king's men and Stig Andersen Hvide used the title Regis Danorum Marscalcus ("Marshal of the Danish King") shortly before his conviction in 1287 for the murder of King Eric V. Over the course of the 15th century, the Marsk came to represent the Realm (Privy Council), rather than the King, and in 1536 the title was finally changed to Rigsmarsk or Marscalcus Regni.

After the Scanian War and with the introduction of absolute monarchy the office disappeared. Anders Bille died a Swedish prisoner of war and Axel Urup then served as a Rigsmarsk from 1658 to 1660 but was never formally appointed. After that the title continued to exist for a while as a sort of honorary title but was then abandoned. The function was taken over by generals who had been promoted through the ranks rather than being chosen among nobles.

List of officeholders
List of Marsks and Rigsmarsks.

See also
 Rentekammeret

References

External links
 Biograpgies of Marshals of the Realm

Military history of Denmark
Government of Denmark